2018 Arab Basketball Championship for Men was the 23rd edition of the Arab Basketball Championship, a men's basketball regional  championship of Arab world that ended with Saudi Arabia being crowned winner. The tournament was hosted by Egypt for the ninth time and featured 5 teams.

Participating teams

Venues

Squads

Preliminary round

Knockout stage

Bracket

Semi-finals

Third place match

Final

Final standings

External links
Arab Nations Cup (2018) - asia-basket.com

2018
Basketball
Basketball competitions in Africa between national teams
Basketball competitions in Asia between national teams